The National symbols of Slovenia are the symbols used in Slovenia and abroad to represent the nation and its people.

Political and ethnic symbols
The most common and recognizable of these are the National anthem of Slovenia and the Flag of Slovenia.
The Coat of arms of Slovenia, a part of the flag itself.
A leaf of a Linden or Lime tree, an important part of Slovene national heritage. Village assemblies, councils and other gatherings were traditionally held around circular tables beneath such a tree.
The stylized graphical representation of the three peaks of Mount Triglav, the central device of the current coat of arms, has functioned as a national symbol since World War II, having been the emblem of the Liberation Front and subsequent communist-era arms.
The coat of arms of Carniola or just its eagle are still considered national symbols, being the signs of one of the two historical Slavic duchies, Carniola and Carantania, but are considered historic rather than current ones.
The principal symbols of Carantania, such as the Prince's Stone and the Duke's Chair, are considered Slovene national symbols by Slovenes, but this point of view has been opposed by Slovene scholars and many Austrians, most notably Jörg Haider.
In the late 1980s, several symbols from the Middle Ages were revived as Slovene national symbols, though their use is largely restricted to nationalist circles. Among them, the most popular are the so-called Slovene Hat, the crest of the coat of arms of the Slovene March, and the Black Panther, a reconstruction of the supposed coat of arms of the principality of Carantania.

Cultural symbols
Another symbol connected to Triglav comes from the folktale of the Goldenhorn, a  mythical chamois living in an enchanted garden near its summit. 
The carnation is widely cultivated in Slovenia; the red carnation in particular is considered the national flower. 
Creatures endemic to Slovenia, including the olm, the Carniolan honey bee or the Lipizzaner horse are sometimes also considered as representing the Slovene national identity. 
The painting of The Sower (1907) by Ivan Grohar, writings by the Protestant reformer Primož Trubar and France Prešeren, the Slovene Romantic poet, are also considered national symbols. The latter's work includes the national anthem.
Distinctive architecture such as the hayrack also fits into this category, notably the double kozolec known as a toplar.

See also 
 Slovenes
 Slovene Lands
 History of Slovenia
 Culture of Slovenia
 Slovene euro coins
 Black panther (symbol)

References

 Republic of Slovenia Government Communication Office

External links 

 Government Communication Office - National Insignia
 Republic of Slovenia National Assembly - National Symbols
 Slovenian Symbols - Marko Pogačnik's Explanation
 Heraldry and vexillology of Slovenia

 
Slovenian culture